Agustín Cattaneo (born August 28, 1988) is an Argentine professional footballer who plays as a centre-back.

References
 
 

Living people
1988 births
Argentine footballers
Footballers from Buenos Aires
Association football defenders
Club Atlético Tigre footballers
Club Almagro players
Figueirense FC players
Huracán de Tres Arroyos footballers
Deportivo Armenio footballers
Club Atlético Platense footballers
Club Comunicaciones footballers
Olimpo footballers
CSyD Tristán Suárez footballers
Comunicaciones F.C. players
Persita Tangerang players
Primera B Metropolitana players
Campeonato Brasileiro Série B players
Torneo Federal A players
Primera Nacional players
Liga Nacional de Fútbol de Guatemala
Liga 1 (Indonesia) players
Argentine expatriate footballers
Expatriate footballers in Brazil
Argentine expatriate sportspeople in Brazil
Expatriate footballers in Guatemala
Argentine expatriate sportspeople in Guatemala
Expatriate footballers in Indonesia
Argentine expatriate sportspeople in Indonesia